The 87th Fighter Wing is an inactive United States Air Force unit. Its last assignment was with the XXII Tactical Air Command, based at Florence, Italy. It was inactivated on 11 October 1950.

History

Lineage
 Constituted as 87th Fighter Wing on 14 October 1943
 Activated on 25 October 1943
 Disbanded in Italy on 1 April 1945

Assignments
 First Air Force, 25 October – 15 December 1943
 XXII Tactical Air Command, 11 January 1944 – 1 April 1945

Stations
 Mitchel Field, New York, 25 October – 15 December 1943
 Nouvion Airfield, Algeria, 11 January 1944
 Caserta (Naples), Italy, February 1944
 Bastia, Corsica, 28 March 1944
 Vescovato, Corsica, 9 May 1944
 Furiani, Corsica, 13 July 1944
 Caserta, Italy, 22 September 1944
 Florence Airfield, Italy, 25 December 1944 – 1 April 1945.

Components
 57th Fighter Group: 23 April – 10 September 1944
 79th Fighter Group: June-25 August 1944
 86th Fighter Group: 9–15 September 1944

Operations
Formed at Mitchel Field, New York. Moved overseas to Algeria, December 1943 – January 1944, and operated with Twelfth Air Force in the Mediterranean theater, primarily directing tactical fighter groups in Italy from April 1944 until the wing's groups were reassigned in September 1944 to XXII Tactical Air Command. Existed as a paper unit until inactivation in April 1945.

References

 Maurer, Maurer. Air Force Combat Units of World War II. Maxwell AFB, Alabama: Office of Air Force History, 1983. .

087
Military units and formations established in 1943
Military units and formations disestablished in 1945